Brian S. Lowery (born 1974) is an American social psychologist.

Lowery obtained a bachelor's degree from the University of Illinois at Urbana–Champaign in 1996, and subsequently began graduate study at the University of California, Los Angeles, where he earned a master's degree in 1998 and a doctorate in 2002. He began teaching at Stanford University upon graduation, and was later named Walter Kenneth Kilpatrick Professor of Organizational Behavior.

Bibliography

References

1974 births
Living people
American social psychologists
21st-century American psychologists
21st-century American scientists
Stanford University faculty
University of Illinois Urbana-Champaign alumni
University of California, Los Angeles alumni